Robert Henry Caverly from Villanova University, Villanova, PA was named Fellow of the Institute of Electrical and Electronics Engineers (IEEE) in 2013 for contributions to modeling and design of radio frequency switching devices, and was elevated to Life Fellow in 2020, he became a Life Fellow of the IEEE.

Early life
Born in Cincinnati, Ohio in 1954, he received his Ph.D. degree in electrical engineering from The Johns Hopkins University in 1983. and a M.S.E.E and B.S.E.E degrees from the North Carolina State University in 1978 and 1976, respectively. He is the older son of Janet van Lierop Caverly and Robert H Caverly and grew up in Greensboro and Fayetteville, NC. He has one sibling, a sister, Janet Caverly Overstreet. He was first introduced to electronics by fixing the family televisions and by also received a small commercial shortwave receiver for a Christmas present.  He was intrigued by the idea of hearing stations from all over the world, and eventually built a vacuum-tube shortwave receiver and obtained his amateur radio license in 1970, and eventually obtained his Extra Class license (WB4PWZ).  He graduated from Reid Ross High School in Fayetteville, NC in 1972.  He married Margery (nee Miller) Caverly (Maggie) in 1979, and they have two sons, Robert William Caverly (married to Sarah) and Matthew Tucker Caverly (married to Jen).

Career Biography

He has been a faculty member at Villanova University in the Department of Electrical and Computer Engineering since 1997 and is a Full Professor.  Previously, he was a Professor for more than 14 years at the University of Massachusetts Dartmouth.  Dr. Caverly's research interests are focused on the characterization of semiconductor devices such as PIN diodes and FETs in the microwave and RF control environment, including communication systems, reconfigurable systems and magnetic resonance imaging scanners.  He has published more than 100 journal and conference papers in both technology and pedagogy, and is the author of the books Microwave and RF Semiconductor Control Device Modeling (2016) and CMOS RFIC Design Principles (2007), both from Artech House.  An IEEE Life Fellow, Dr. Caverly is the Editor-in-Chief of the IEEE Microwave Magazine (2018-present), a Track Editor for the IEEE Journal of Microwaves, a voting member of the Microwave Theory and Technology Society (MTT-S) Administrative Committee, and a member of the Biomedical Applications (MTT-28) and HF-VHF-UHF Technology (MTT-20) Technical Committees of the MTT-S.

References 

Fellow Members of the IEEE
Villanova University faculty
Johns Hopkins University alumni
North Carolina State University alumni
Living people
1954 births
American electrical engineers